OC Transpo is a public transit commission that operates 170 bus routes, two light rail lines, and a paratransit system in Ottawa and the National Capital Region.

General information

The last two digits of route numbers correspond to service area:
 00s and 10s – Central
 20s – Gloucester
 30s – Orléans
 40s – Alta Vista
 50s – Ottawa West
 60s – Kanata/Stittsville
 70s – Barrhaven/Riverside South
 80s – Nepean
 90s – South Keys/Greenboro

NOTE: Routes with a white background operate during select time periods or certain days of the week only. The above is current as of June 21, 2022.

Routes
Note: services updated as of October 6, 2019.

School trips 
These trips provide service to/from various middle and high school for students enrolled in such schools.

Regional Partner Routes 
These routes are operated by private bus companies on behalf of OC Transpo. Fares differ by operators, as well as levels of service. Route 505 is considered an event route and is operated by OC Transpo.

References

External links
 OC Transpo website

OC Transpo